Helen Gamboa Sotto (born Helen Albent Gamboa; May 7, 1945) is a Filipina actress, singer, dancer and former beauty queen.

Personal life 
Gamboa was born Helen Albent Gamboa at 6:35 PM on May 7, 1945 at Maternity and Children's Hospital (now Dr. Jose Fabella Memorial Hospital) in Santa Cruz, Manila to Domingo Ponce Gamboa (1908-1987) and Eusebia Pangilinan Albent (1914-1986). She is also the sister of Elaine Gamboa (mother of Sharon Cuneta).

Gamboa is married to Senator Vicente "Tito" Sotto III an actor, comedian, TV host and politician. They have four children: Romina Frances, Diorella Maria, Gian Carlo and Ciara Anna; eight grandsons: Romino Vicente, Victorio, Vicente IV, Carlos Edrigu, Alessandro Jose, Marciano, Juan Rossano, Domiku Yosef and Vincenzo Jose; and two granddaughters: Helena and Amaria Jiliana. Their son Vincent Paul died 5 months after his birth in 1975, due to side effects of contraceptives according to doctors at the Makati Medical Center.

In the 2010 elections, her son Gian Carlo was elected councilor of Quezon City's 3rd District and served for three consecutive terms before being elected as the vice mayor of the city in the 2019 elections, while her daughter Diorella Maria "Lala" was elected in the 6th District of the same city before being appointed chairperson of the Movie and Television Review and Classification Board in 2022.

Career

1960s: Early works 
Gamboa became a runner-up to Cynthia Ugalde by a point in the Miss Press Photography of the Philippines contest in 1961.

In the late 1960s, Gamboa was given the title "Dancing Queen" of Philippine cinema and TV musicals; this title was given to her prior to the popularity of the ABBA song with the same title, the title having been given eight years before the Swedish rock band's song was released in 1976.

2001–2017: Breakthrough 
Gamboa made a brief TV comeback through the ABS-CBN Primetime TV series Sa Dulo ng Walang Hanggan in 2001-2003, playing the role of Nelia Santos. In 2009, she made her official comeback to Philippine primetime television in ABS-CBN network's Tayong Dalawa, where her son Gian also appeared. This marked Gamboa's 2nd Primetime TV series and comeback where she portrayed the antagonist Elizabeth Martinez in the TV series; the series also became a successful international phenomenon and featured a strong cast of award-winning actors from three generations of television, film, theater actors, some of whom came from appearances in internationally acclaimed indie films.

In 2012, after a two-year hiatus, Gamboa played Margaret Montenegro in the highly acclaimed and most-watched program Walang Hanggan, featuring another ensemble cast where she was reunited with her Tayong Dalawa co-star Coco Martin who led the series. Gamboa's role was a main role in the series, Margaret Montenegro being the series' main antagonist.

On October 21, 2012, Gamboa showed her knowledge of the dance "Gangnam Style" in her performance in the Walang Hanggang Pasasalamat Concert at the Smart Araneta Coliseum.

2017–2019: Return to GMA 
In 2017, she finally returned to GMA Network after twenty-one years and starred as Lolita Honorio in Super Ma'am, which is also her television comeback. She was supposed to play Liza Lorena's role in a past GMA drama, Akin Pa Rin ang Bukas, back in 2013 after signing an exclusive contract but dropped out for health reasons.

2019–present: Return to ABS-CBN 
Gamboa-Sotto returned to ABS-CBN for Kahit Minsan Lang but the series was cancelled before it could start filming because of restrictions caused by the COVID-19 pandemic in the Philippines. Gamboa was supposed to be part of Ikaw Lang ang Iibigin but dropped out and Gina Pareno replaced her said role.

Discography
Albums
Helen Gamboa Sings Together Again (Jonal Records, released in March 1967)
He'll Come Back To Me (Jonal Records, released in 1967)
Shing-A-Ling Time (Jonal Records, released in 1968)
Dance To The Music of Helen Gamboa (Ans Records, released in 1968)
La Gamboa (Vicor Records, released in 1969)
Bunny Chanel (RCA Victor International/WEA, released in 1979 under the name "Bunny Chanel")
Bunny Chanel 2 (RCA Victor International/WEA, released in 1980 under the name "Bunny Chanel")

Singles

1966
Gone / Band of Gold (debut single)
What They Have Done to the Rain? / He'll Come Back to Me (with JA and The Jitterbugs)
The More I See You / These Boots Are Made for Walkin' (with Doming Amarillo and his Tiajuana Brass)
Strangers in the Night / The Impossible Dream
Just Say Goodbye / I Can't Remember Ever Loving You
The Thirty-First of June / It's Not Unusual
I Love You / No Other Love
A Groovy Kind of Love / Forever with You (with JA and The Jitterbugs)
Soul Time / In the Midnight Hour
Sweet Love and Sweet Forgiveness / Piel Canela
Whispering Hope / Silver Bells (duet with Louie Levant)
The In Crowd /
Michael (Row the Boat Ashore) /

1967
Somethin' Stupid / Summer Wine (duet with Gilbert Gamboa)
Two of Us / Till We Meet Again (duet with Louie Levant)
This Is My Song / Color My World
Together Again / Cast Your Fate to the Wind
All I See Is You / All Cried Out
Oh, Oh What A Kiss / Wednesday's Child
Only You (Can Break My Heart) / Time Alone Will Tell
Uptight / Single Girl (with JA and The Jitterbugs)
Please Don't Go / Cherish
Sugar, Let's Shing-A-Ling / Shing-A-Ling Time 
Puppet On A String (with JA and The Jitterbugs) /
Somebody to Love / 

1968
Ain't No Mountain High Enough / Two Can Have a Party (with The Tilt-Down Men)
I'm Coming Home / Kiss Me Goodbye
After You / Why Can't I Remember to Forget You
Ode To Billie Joe / We've Got To Have Love (with The Tilt-Down Men)
Don't Give Up / Everytime I See a Rainbow
Angel of the Morning / Sweet Memories
It's a Happening World / Shoot Your Shot
Bang-Shang-A-Lang / Shotgun
Son of a Preacher Man /

1969
The Fool On The Hill / The Horse (Love is All Right)
Ob-La-Di, Ob-La-Da / Harper Valley PTA
Mississippi Delta / The Glory of Love
I'm a Tiger / Every Day I Have to Cry Some
This Girl's in Love with You / Where Is Tomorrow
Those Were the Days / Stay Away from Love
Bitter Memories / Our Day Will Come
Boom Bang-A-Bang / The Windmills of Your Mind
Happy Heart / Let The Music Start
Put a Little Love in Your Heart /

1970
Evil Ways / Great Big Bundle of Love
If Ever You Go / Put A Smile on Your Face
Do the Popcorn / Both Sides Now

1973
Anytime of the Year / It's a Crying Shame
A Cowboy's Work Is Never Done / Betcha By Golly, Wow
Put Your Hand in the Hand / Rose Garden
Do Me / Somebody Waiting
Love a Little Longer / Rock and Roll Lullaby

1974
Doctor's Orders / Only Yesterday
Please, Mr. Postman / My Melody of Love
Head Over Heels / Leave a Little Room

Filmography

Television

Movies
Etiquette for Mistresses (2015) as Conchita San Diego
Segunda Mano (2011) as Adela Domingo
Mano Po 6: A Mother's Love (2009)
Bagong Bayani (1995) as Flor Contemplacion
Umiyak Pati Langit (1991)
Oras-oras, Araw-araw (1989)
Kailan Mahuhugasan ang Kasalanan? (1989) as Adora Meneses
Hot Summer (1989)
Mama Said Papa Said I Love You (1985)
Give Me Five! (1984)
Angelita, Ako ang Iyong Ina Part II (1982)
Angelita... Ako ang Iyong Ina (1980) as Janet
Roberta (1979)
Feliciano (1978)
Mga Mata Ni Angelita (1978) as Janet - Gonzalo's Daughter
Kapitan Kulas (1975)
Darna and the Giants (1974) as X3X
Biktima (1974) as Nurse
Sarhento Fofonggay... A, ewan! (1974)
Ako'y Tao, May Dugo at Lamán (1970) as Luisa
Love Is for the Two of Us (1970)
Banda 24 (1969)
Matimbang ang Dugo sa Tubig (1969)
Ngitngit ng Pitong Whistle Bomb (1968) as Nerissa
Bang-Shang-A-Lang (1968)
Boogaloo (1968)
Kailanma'y 'Di Ka Mag-iisa (1968)
Let's Go Hippie (1968)
May I Go Out (1968)
O Kaka, O Kaka (1968)
Operation: Discothèque (1968)
Otra Vez, Señorita (1968)
Like Father, Like Son: Kung Ano ang Punò Siya ang Bunga (1967)
Target: The A-Go-Go Generation (1967)
Yesterday (1967)
Palos: Counterspy (1966)
Baril sa Aking Kamay (1966)
Doble Trece (1966)
Stranger in the Night (1966)
Guillermo Bravado (1965)
Dolpinger (1965)
Misyong Mapanganib (1965)
DJ Dance Time (1964)
Let's Go (1964)
The Nite Owl (Dance Party) (1964)
Gorio... Kahapon, Ngayon at Bukas (1963)
Hugo, the Sidewalk Vendor (1962)
Gorio and His Jeepney (1962)
Sakay and Moy (1962)
Walang Pagkalupig (1962)
Palanca (1960)
Maalaala Mo Kaya (1954)

Awards

References

External links

Filipino film actresses
Filipino people of American descent
Filipino people of Spanish descent
Filipino television actresses
1945 births
Living people
People from Santa Cruz, Manila
Actresses from Manila
Helen
Vicor Music artists